Bergstraße ("Mountain Road") is a Kreis (district) in the south of Hesse, Germany.  It is at the northern end of the Bergstraße route. Neighboring districts are Groß-Gerau, Darmstadt-Dieburg, Odenwaldkreis, Rhein-Neckar-Kreis, the urban district Mannheim, the Rhein-Pfalz-Kreis, and the urban district of Worms. Kreis Bergstraße belongs both to the Rhine Neckar Area and the Rhein-Main Region.

History 
The district was created in 1938, when the two former districts Bensheim and Heppenheim were merged.

Geography 
The district is located in the Odenwald mountains, with the 517m high Melibokus as the highest elevation. The Bergstraße is a tourist route which leads from Darmstadt to Wiesloch; the northern part of this route goes through the district and gave it its name.

Coat of arms 
The coat of arms is split into four quarters. In the top-left it shows the Starkenburg castle, which is one of the major landmarks in the district and a reminiscence of the former Province Starkenburg, a former provinces of the Grand Duchy of Hesse, to which the District once belonged. The flower in the top-right stands for the flower-richness in spring. The cross in the bottom-left derives from the coat of arms of the imperial abbey of Lorsch Abbey, and the lion in the bottom-right is the sign of Hesse.

German Formula One driver Sebastian Vettel, who is from Heppenheim, has the Bergstraße coat of arms on the front (chin area) of his racing helmet.

Politics 
Bergstraße (electoral district) for the Bundestag.

Towns and municipalities

References

External links

 Official website (German)

 
Odenwald